South Cooking Lake is a hamlet in Alberta, Canada within Strathcona County.

The Cree, Blackfoot and the Sarcee were the first to inhabit the area, and that is where the name originally came from. Cooking Lake was fished commercially until 1926. Large numbers of buffalo, lynx, fox, mink, muskrat, elk, deer, moose, wolves, coyotes, and black bears roamed the area.

Today it is still possible to see a variety of wildlife and birds throughout the area. There is a day-use park, which is a great place for family picnics, boating, and windsurfing. There is a boat launch, walking trails, picnic sites, and waterfowl viewing areas. The community hall has been completely renovated and is available for rent.

Demographics 

The population of South Cooking Lake according to the 2022 municipal census conducted by Strathcona County is 277, an increase from its 2018 municipal census population count of 270.

Transportation 
Edmonton/Cooking Lake Airport is located nearby and serves the community.

See also 
List of communities in Alberta
List of designated places in Alberta
List of hamlets in Alberta

References 

Hamlets in Alberta
Designated places in Alberta
Strathcona County